The Beaver River is a river in Grey County and Simcoe County in Southern Ontario, Canada. It is part of the Great Lakes Basin, and is a tributary of Lake Huron. The river's drainage basin is under the auspices of Grey Sauble Conservation.

Course
The river begins in a field in Clearview, Simcoe County, and flows west immediately into Grey Highlands, Grey County. The river continues southwest, takes in the left tributary Little Beaver River, and heads into Eugenia Lake at the edge of the Niagara Escarpment at the community of Eugenia; the lake was formed when the river was regulated for flow control and a hydroelectric plant was built. It continues over the Eugenia Falls and takes in the left tributary Boyne River, and turns north, flowing through Beaver Valley into the municipality of The Blue Mountains. The river then heads north, passes over two dams and reaches its mouth at Nottawasaga Bay on Georgian Bay, Lake Huron, at the community of Thornbury.

Natural history
A fish ladder near Thornbury allows fish to reach spawning areas up river.

Recreation
The river is also a popular recreational canoe route. The Beaver River valley is home to the Beaver Valley Ski Club.

Tributaries
Grier Creek (left)
Mill Creek (right)
Bill's Creek (left)
Wodehouse Creek (left)
Boyne River (Grey County) (left)
Black's Creek (right)
Little Beaver River (left)

References

Sources

See also
Beaver Valley (Ontario)
List of rivers of Ontario
Beaver Valley Ski Club

Rivers of Grey County
Rivers of Simcoe County
Tributaries of Georgian Bay